Nikola Ćirić (born 2 August 1983) is a Serbian tennis coach and former professional tennis player, who played mainly on the ATP Challenger Tour. He turned pro in 2000 and reached his career-high ranking of 151 on 1 August 2011. He was coached by a former rugby professional  Damir Dimitrijević.

He was the coach of Serbian tennis players Nikola Cacic 2014,  Peđa Krstin 2015-2016, Marko Tepavac. 2016, Nikola Milojevic (tennis) 2019-2021, coach of Serbia Billie Jean King Cup team 2012,2013,2015,2016,2017,2018,2019,2020.

References

External links
 
  
 Ćirić Recent Match Results

1983 births
Living people
Serbian male tennis players
Serbian tennis coaches
Tennis players from Belgrade
Universiade medalists in tennis
Universiade silver medalists for Serbia and Montenegro
Medalists at the 2005 Summer Universiade